Fred Krebs (23 November 1931 – 30 November 1995) was a British racing cyclist. He rode in the 1955 Tour de France.

References

1931 births
1995 deaths
British male cyclists
Place of birth missing